A.O. Agios Nikolaos Football Club, also known simply as AOAN, short for Athlitikós Ómilos Aghíou Nikoláou Krítis (translated Athletic Club of Agios Nikolaos Crete), is a Greek association football club based in Agios Nikolaos, Lasithi, Crete.

History
The club was founded in 1947. Its crest is a star and its colors are blue and white. They currently compete in the regional Lasithi FCA A Division Championship, the top-level amateur football division in Lasithi, and host their home games at the Agios Nikolaos Municipal Stadium. They have previously played in both the second and third levels of the Greek football league system.

Honours

Domestic
Delta Ethniki (4th National Division)
Winners (1): 1993–94

Regional
Lasithi FCA Championship
Winners (4): 1989−90, 2010−11, 2012−13, 2018−19
Lasithi FCA Cup
Winners (9): 1983−84, 1984−85, 1985−86, 1986−87, 1987−88, 1988−89, 1989−90, 1993−94, 2004−05 
Heraklion FCA Championship
Winners (1): 1979−80
Heraklion FCA Cup
Winners (1): 1979−80

Players

Current squad

References

Football clubs in Lasithi
Football clubs in Crete
Association football clubs established in 1947
1947 establishments in Greece
Gamma Ethniki clubs